The Saipa 111 is a small, entry level hatchback car produced in 2010 by SAIPA in Iran.  It is actually a hatchback model of SAIPA 132 modified by SAIPA R&D center.

Specifications
 Engine : 4 – cylinder in line, sohc
 Engine displacement : 1/3 lit
 Max power :63 hp @ 5200 rpm
 Gearbox : 5 – speed manual
 Fuel tank capacity : 37 lit
 Fuel consumption in extra urban : 5/6 lit @ 100 km
 Fuel consumption in urban : 6/9 lit @100 km
 Length : 3935 mm
 Width : 1605mm
 Height : 1455 mm

External links
Official website of Saipa Corp

Cars of Iran
Saipa vehicles
Cars introduced in 2010